A periodization of capitalism seeks to distinguish stages of development that help understanding of features of capitalism through time. The best-known periodizations that have been proposed distinguish these stages as:

Early / monopoly / state monopoly capitalism (Sweezy)
Free trade / monopoly / finance capitalism (Hilferding)
Early capitalism (primitive accumulation) / colonialism / imperialism (Hobson, Lenin, Bukharin) 
Extensive stage / intensive stage / late capitalism (Aglietta)

The Marxist periodization of capitalism into the stages: agricultural capitalism, merchant capitalism, industrial capitalism and state capitalism.

Another periodization includes merchant capitalism, industrial and finance capitalism, and global capitalism.

See also
Rudolf Hilferding
Ernest Mandel
Paul Sweezy

References

Aglietta, Michel, Régulation et crises du capitalisme, Kalmann-Lévy, Paris, 1976

External links
 Imperialism: The Highest Stage of Capitalism by V.I. Lenin

Capitalism
Periodization